

Guggisee is a mountain lake in the Lötschental in the canton of Valais in Switzerland. The lake is located at an altitude of  near the Alp Guggistafel.

Access 
From Fafleralp the Fafleralp circular trail leads to the Guggisee (walking time about one hour) and further to the Anusee and Anenhütte (Anen hut).

References 

Lakes of Valais